Tsentralnoye (also known as Borborduk ) is a village in Batken Region of Kyrgyzstan. It is part of the Leylek District. Its population was 6,900 in 2021.

Population

References

Populated places in Batken Region